Island Masters is a midprice CD series that includes re-releases of records from the 1970s and 1980s by PolyGram. In 1989 Island Records was sold to PolyGram. The series was released in the UK and Europe.

In the UK, the discs were released with the prefix IMCD and catalogue numbers starting with 1. In some European countries, the catalogue numbers were the same, and in some they were not. This series was not released in the US. In Canada, some releases were made available as imports through PolyGram Canada. It was Island's first major attempt to make available its huge back catalogue on CD. The first year of the sublabel has seen more than 80 releases. New releases appeared for some years. In 2000, the label was re-modeled and renamed to Island Remasters. While the packaging of the Island Masters of the 1980s and 1990s was simple the newer Island Remaster followed a trend to a better packaging with higher print quality of the cover, additional slip cases, booklets, addition tracks and label prints using the label of the original LP releases.

Island Masters, 1989/1990
IMCD 1 - B-52's: B-52's
IMCD 2 - Bourgeois Tagg: Yoyo, original release: 1987 on Island US
IMCD 3 - Black Uhuru: Reggae Greats, original release: 1985 on Island Reggae Greats
IMCD 4 - Buckwheat Zydeco: On A Night Like This, original release: 1987
IMCD 5 - Burning Spear: Reggae Greats, original release: 1985 on Island Reggae Greats
IMCD 6 - Kid Creole & The Coconuts: Tropical Gangsters, original UK release: 1982 on ZE/Island ILPS 7016
IMCD 7 - Derek & Clive: Peter Cook & Dudley Moore present Derek & Clive (live)
IMCD 8 - Nick Drake: Five Leaves Left, 5/1989
IMCD 9 - Eric B. & Rakim: Paid In Full
IMCD 10 - Fairport Convention: In Real Time, 6/1990, original release: 12/1987 on ILPS 9883
IMCD 11 - Marianne Faithfull: Broken English
IMCD 12 - Marianne Faithfull: Strange Weather
IMCD 13 - Frankie Goes To Hollywood: Liverpool
IMCD 14 - Linton Kwesi Johnson: Reggae Greats, original release: 1985 on Island Reggae Greats
IMCD 15 - Grace Jones: Warm Leatherette, original release in 1980
IMCD 16 - Grace Jones: Island Life, original release in 1985
IMCD 17 - Grace Jones: Nightclubbing
IMCD 18 - Grace Jones: Living My Life
IMCD 19 - Grace Jones: Portfolio
IMCD 20 - Robert Palmer: Sneakin' Sally Through the Alley
IMCD 21 - Robert Palmer: Clues, original release in 1980 on Island ILPS
IMCD 22 - Robert Palmer: Pride, original release in 1983 on Island ILPS
IMCD 23 - Robert Palmer: Double Fun, original release in 1978 on Island ILPS
IMCD 24 - Robert Palmer: Pressure Drop, original release in 1975 on Island ILPS
IMCD 25 - Robert Palmer: Riptide, original release in 1985 on Island ILPS
IMCD 26 - Robert Palmer: Secrets, original release in 1979 on Island ILPS
IMCD 27 - Shriekback: Go Bang!, original release: 1988
IMCD 28 - Shriekback: Big Night Music, original release: 1986
IMCD 29 - Sly & Robbie: Rhythm Killers
IMCD 30 - Ultravox: Three On One, original release in 1978
IMCD 32 - V.A.: Sweet Lies (original motion picture soundtrack)
IMCD 33 - Steel Pulse: Reggae Greats, original release: 1985 on Island Reggae Greats
IMCD 34 - Cat Stevens: Catch Bull At Four, original release: 1972 on LP: Island ILPS 9206
IMCD 35 - Cat Stevens: Mona Bone Jakon, original release: 1970 on Island ILPS
IMCD 36 - Cat Stevens: Tea For The Tillerman, original release: 1970 on Island ILPS
IMCD 37 - Third World: Reggae Greats, original release: 1985 on Island Reggae Greats IRG 9
IMCD 38 - Toots & The Maytals: Reggae Greats, original release: 1985 on Island Reggae Greats IRG 1
IMCD 40 - Traffic: John Barleycorne Must Die, 1970
IMCD 41 - Traffic: Last Exit, original release: 1969
IMCD 42 - Traffic: The Low Spark Of High Heeled Boys, original released: 1971 on Island ILPS 9180
IMCD 43 - Traffic: Mr. Fantasy, original release: 1968
IMCD 44 - Traffic: Shoot Out At The Fantasy Factory, original release: 1973
IMCD 45 - Traffic: Traffic, original release: 1968
IMCD 46 - The Triffids: Calenture, original release: 1987 on Island ILPS/CID 9885
IMCD 47 - Trouble Funk: Trouble Over Here, original release: 1987
IMCD 48 - Tom Waits: Swordfishtrombone, original release: 1983 on Island ILPS 9762
IMCD 49 - Tom Waits:  Rain Dogs, original release: 1985
IMCD 50 - Tom Waits: Frank's Wild Years, original release: 1987
IMCD 51 - V.A.: Intensified!, original release: 1979
IMCD 52 - V.A.: More Intensivied!, original release: 1980
IMCD 53 - V.A.: Club Ska, original release: 1980
IMCD 54 - Aswad: Live And Direct, original release: 1983
IMCD 55 - Aswad: A New Chapter Of Dub, original release: 1982
IMCD 56 - Aswad: Hulet, original release: 1979
IMCD 57 - Aswad: Aswad Showcase, original release: 1981
IMCD 58 - Aswad: Aswad, original release: 1976
IMCD 59 - Aswad: To The Top, original release: 1987
IMCD 60 - Fairport Convention: Liege & Lief, 10/1989
IMCD 61 - Fairport Convention: Unhalfbricking, 2/1990, original release: 1969
IMCD 62 - Free: Tons Of Sobs, original release in 1968
IMCD 63 - Free: Highway, original release in 1970
IMCD 64 - Free: Free (self-titled), original release in 1969
IMCD 67 - John Martyn: Grace And Danger, original release: 1980
IMCD 68 - John Martyn: Piece By Piece, original release: 1986
IMCD 70 - Cat Stevens: Buddha & The Chocolate Box
IMCD 71 - Nick Drake: Bryter Layter, 10/1989

Island Masters, 1990s
IMCD 72 - Cat Stevens: Foreigner
IMCD 73 - Free: Free Live!, original release in 1971
IMCD 75 - U2: Wide Awake In America, original release: 1985
IMCD 76 - V.A.: Angel Heart
IMCD 77 - V.A.: An Officer & A Gentleman, original release: 1986
IMCD 80 - Free: Fire and Water, original release in 1970
IMCD 83 - Murray Head: Say it Ain't So, original release in 1975 
IMCD 84 - Paul Kossoff: Back Street Crawler, original release: 1973
IMCD 87 - Mott The Hopple: Walkin' With A Mountain
IMCD 88 - The Sparks: The Best Of The Sparks, 1990
IMCD 89 - Wild Tchoupitoulas: Wild Tchoupitoulas, original release: 1976
IMCD 90 - The Slits: Cut, 1990, original release: 1979
IMCD 91 - Nick Drake: Heaven in a Wild Flower, 4/1990, original release: 5/1985
IMCD 92 - Kevin Ayers/John Cale/Eno/Nico: June 1, 1974, original release: 1974
IMCD 93 - Vinegar Joe: Rock'n'Roll Gypsies, original release: 1972
IMCD 94 - Nick Drake: Pink Moon, 4/1990, original release: 1972
IMCD 95 - Fairport Convention: Live Convention, 4/1990
IMCD 97 - Fairport Convention: What We Did On Our Holidays, 4/1990
IMCD 98 - Philipp Glass: Koyaanisqatsi
IMCD 99 - Jade Warrior: Floating World, original release: 1974
IMCD 100 - Jade Warrior: Way Of The Sun, original release: 1978
IMCD 105 - The B-52's: Bouncing Off The Satellite, original release: 1987
IMCD 106 - The B-52's: Party Mix, original release: 1981
IMCD 107 - The B-52's: Mesopotamia, original release: 1982
IMCD 108 - The B-52's: Wild Planet, original release: 1980
IMCD 109 - The B-52's: Whammy!, original release: 1983
IMCD 110 - V.A.: Built For The 90's
IMCD 116 - Andy Sheppard: Introductions In The Dark, original release: 1989 on Antilles Records
IMCD 120 - Boo-Yaa T.R.B.E.: New Funky Nation, original release: 1990
IMCD 128 - Fairport Convention: The History Of Fairport Convention, original release: 1972
IMCD 129 - Mike Heron: Smiling Men With Bad Reputation, original release: 1971
IMCD 130 - Incredible String Band: Acrobat As Regards The Air, original release: 1971
IMCD 131 - John & Beverley Martyn: Stormbringer, original release: 1970
IMCD 132 - Sandy Denny: Sandy, original release: 1972, re-released on IMCD 314 in 2005
IMCD 133 - Sandy Denny: The North Star Grass Man And The Ravens, original release: 1971, re-releasec on IMCD 313 in 2005
IMCD 134 - John Martyn: London Conversation, original release: 1967
IMCD 135 - John Martyn: Bless The Weather, original release: 1971
IMCD 136 - Anthrax: Spreading The Disease, original release: 1985
IMCD 141 - U2: War, original release: 1983
IMCD 145 - Basement 5: 1965-1980 / Basement 5 In Dub, original release in 1980
IMCD 152 - Fairport Convention: Rosie, 8/1992
IMCD 153 - Fairport Convention: Babbacombe Lee, 8/1992
IMCD 154 - Fairport Convention: Nine, 8/1992
IMCD 155 - Fairport Convention: Rising For The Moon, 8/1992
IMCD 158 - Traffic: Smiling Phases (Double CD), 1991
IMCD 166 - Fairport Convention: Angel Delight, 3/1993
IMCD 174 - Nico: The End..., 1974
IMCD 186 - Anthrax: Among The Living, original release: 1987
IMCD 187 - Anthrax: State Of Euphoria, original release: 1988
IMCD 196 - Nick Drake: Way To Blue - An Introduction To Nick Drake 1994
IMCD 198 - Sparks: Kimono My House original release: 1974
IMCD 199 - Sparks: Propaganda original release: 1974
IMCD 200 - Sparks: Indiscreet original release: 1975
IMCD 201 - Sparks: Big Beat original release: 1976
IMCD 203 - John Cale: Guts, original release: 1977
IMCD 219 - The Orb: U.F. Orb, original release: 1992
IMCD 221 - U2: Boy, original release: 1980
IMCD 223 - U2: October, original release: 1981
IMCD 234 - The Orb: The Orb's Adventures Beyond The Ultraworld, original release: 1991
IMCD 236 - U2: The Unforgettable Fire, original release: 1984
IMCD 248 - U2: Live / Under A Blood Red Sky, original release: 1983

Island Remasters series, 2000s
IMCD 261 - The Buggles: The Age of Plastic (Remastered with three tracks that were not released on the LP), 2000
IMCD 264 - Traffic: Mr. Fantasy, 1999
IMCD 265 - Traffic: Traffic, 1999
IMCD 266 - Traffic: John Barleycorn Must Die, 1999
IMCD 270 - Richard & Linda Thompson: The End Of The Rainbow: An Introduction To ..., 2000
IMCD 275 - The Slits: Cut, 2000
IMCD 281 - Free: Tons Of Sobs, 2001
IMCD 282 - Free: Free, 2001
IMCD 283 - Free: Highway, 2002
IMCD 284 - Free: Fire And Water, 2001
IMCD 285 - Fairport Convention: Full House (Remastered with two bonus tracks), 2001
IMCD 286 - Free: Free Live!, 2002
IMCD 287 - Free: Free At Last, 2002
IMCD 288 - Free: Heartbreaker, 2002
IMCD 289 - Fairport Convention: House Full: Live at The L.A. Troubadour (Remastered), 10/2001
IMCD 290 - Fairport Convention: Heyday (Remastered with eight bonus tracks)
IMCD 291 - Fairport Convention: Liege & Lief (Remastered with two bonus tracks), 2002
IMCD 292 - Fairport Convention: Gotte O'Gear, 8/1999
IMCD 293 - Fairport Convention: Unhalfbricking (Remastered with two bonus tracks), 3/2003, original release 1969 on ILPS 9102
IMCD 294 - Fairport Convention: What We Did on Our Holidays (Remastered with three bonus tracks), 3/2003
IMCD 304 - Richard & Linda Thompson: I Want To See The Bright Lights Tonight (Remastered with three bonus tracks)
IMCD 305 - Richard & Linda Thompson: Hokey Pokey (Remastered with five bonus tracks), 2004
IMCD 306 - Richard & Linda Thompson: Pour Down Like Silver (Remstered with four bonus tracks), 2004
IMCD 307 - Fairport Convention: Angel Delight (Remastered with one bonus track), 2004
IMCD 308 - Fairport Convention: Babbacombe Lee (Remastered with two bonus tracks), 2004
IMCD 309 - Fairport Convention: Rosie (Remastered with five bonus tracks), 2004
IMCD 310 - Fairport Convention: Nine (Remastered with four bonus tracks), Aug. 2005
IMCD 311 - Fairport Convention: Live Convention (Remastered with five bonus tracks), Aug. 2005
IMCD 312 - Fairport Convention: Rising For The Moon (Remastered with four bonus tracks), Aug. 2005
IMCD 313 - Sandy Denny: The North Star Grassman And The Ravens (Remastered with four bonus tracks)
IMCD 314 - Sandy Denny: Sandy (Remastered with five bonus tracks), 2005
IMCD 315 - Sandy Denny: Like An Old Fashioned Waltz (Remastered with four bonus tracks), 2005
IMCD 316 - Sandy Denny: Rendezvous (Remastered with five bonus tracks), 2005, original release in 1977 on Island ILPS 9433

See also
 List of record labels

References

British record labels
Record labels established in 1989